Reschen Pass is a mountain pass across the main chain of the Alps, connecting the Upper Inn Valley in the northwest with the Vinschgau region in the southeast. Since 1919, the border between South Tyrol, Italy and Tyrol, Austria has approximately followed the watershed, the pass summit at a height of  being completely on Italian territory.

Geography

Location
Reschen is one of the principal passes of the Alps, located between Brenner Pass to the east and the Splügen to the west. It is part of the drainage divide between the Danube in the north and the Adige in the south.

The village of Reschen (Resia) is directly located on the watershed, on the shore of the Reschensee reservoir, built in 1950 and famous for the bell tower which emerges from the water in front of Graun municipality.

Climate
Reschen has a cool summer humid continental climate. However, minimum temperatures generally stay above .

The above table is for the period 1990–2017.

History
Even before the Roman era, an unnamed bridle path linked the valley of the Inn River with the valley of the Adige (de. Etsch; lad. Adesc) river. The current Reschen Pass route was part of the Via Claudia Augusta, opened about 50 AD. Later superseded by the Via Raetia across Brenner Pass, built at the behest of Emperor Septimius Severus in the 2nd century, it remained one of the few Roman roads leading into the Raetia province and to Augusta Vindelicorum. During the Middle Ages, the pass was an alternative to the passes of Graubünden in the west, though from the 14th century onwards the parallel Brenner Pass road from Bozen through the Eisack Valley in the east gained more and more importance.

Unlike the wide and smooth southern side, the northern side of Reschen Pass has a steep and narrow bottleneck at Finstermünz (1188 m). Archduke Sigismund of Austria had a fortress built here in 1472, and until 1854 a custom house between the Austrian County of Tyrol and Switzerland sat between two fortified bridges over the Inn river.

The Austrian engineer Carl Ritter von Ghega (who already had built the Semmering railway line from Vienna through Lower Austria and Styria to Graz) and Joseph Duile laid out plans for a new road from the fortress of Nauders (1394 m) to Cajetansbrücke near Pfunds (972 m), which was built between 1850 and 1854. This road leads to Reschen Pass along the Eastern, Austrian banking of the Inn, connecting the Austrian lands via Austrian soil. An additional mountain road leads from the Inn valley from the Swiss hamlet Martina resp. the Austrian Martinsbrück up to Norbertshöhe and Nauders, providing a shorter way from Switzerland to Italy than the longer road via Cajetansbrücke. Several structures for a projected railway connection were also built; however, these plans were finally abandoned after World War II.

See also
 List of highest paved roads in Europe
 List of mountain passes

References

External links

Profile on climbbybike.com

Mountain passes of the Alps
Mountain passes of Italy
Mountain passes of Tyrol (state)
Mountain passes of South Tyrol
Austria–Italy border crossings
Rhaetian Alps